Maine Township, Illinois may refer to one of the following townships:

 Maine Township, Cook County, Illinois 
 Maine Township, Grundy County, Illinois

See also

Maine Township (disambiguation)

Illinois township disambiguation pages